A gated community (or walled community) is a form of residential community or housing estate containing strictly controlled entrances for pedestrians, bicycles, and automobiles, and often characterized by a closed perimeter of walls and fences. Historically, cities have built defensive city walls and controlled gates to protect their inhabitants, and such fortifications have also separated quarters of some cities. Today, gated communities usually consist of small residential streets and include various shared amenities. For smaller communities, these amenities may include only a park or other common area. For larger communities, it may be possible for residents to stay within the community for most daily activities. Gated communities are a type of common interest development, but are distinct from  intentional communities.

Given that gated communities are spatially a type of enclave, Setha M. Low, an anthropologist, has argued that they have a negative effect on the net social capital of the broader community outside the gated community. Some gated communities, usually called "guard-gated communities", are staffed by private security guards and are often home to high-value properties, and/or are set up as  retirement villages. Some gated communities are secure enough to resemble fortresses and are intended as such.

Cruise ships function as floating gated communities.

Features

Besides the services of gatekeepers, many gated communities provide other amenities. These may depend on a number of factors including geographical location, demographic composition, community structure, and community fees collected. When there are sub-associations that belong to master associations, the master association may provide many of the amenities. In general, the larger the association the more amenities that can be provided.

Amenities also depend on the type of housing. For example, single-family-home communities may not have a common-area swimming pool, since individual home-owners have the ability to construct their own private pools. A condominium, on the other hand, may offer a community pool, since the individual units do not have the option of a private pool installation.

Typical amenities offered can include one or more:

 Swimming pools
 Bowling alleys
 Tennis courts
 Community centres or clubhouses
 Golf courses
 Marina
 On-site dining
 Playgrounds
 Exercise rooms including workout machines
 Spa
 Coworking spaces

Around the world

In Brazil, the most widespread form of gated community is called "condomínio fechado" (closed housing estate) and is the object of desire of the upper classes. Such a place is a small town with its own infrastructure (reserve power supply, sanitation, and security guards). The purpose of such a community is to protect its residents from exterior violence. The same philosophy is seen on closed buildings and most shopping centres (many of them can only be accessed from inside the parking lot or the garage).

In Pakistan, gated communities are located in big as well as small cities and are considered the standard of high quality living. Defence Housing Authority and Bahria Town are major private gated community developers and administrators and one of the largest in the world. The assets of Bahria Town itself are worth $30 billion. Most gated communities in Pakistan have public parks, schools, hospitals, shopping malls, gymnasiums, and country clubs.

In Argentina, they are called "barrios privados" (literal translation "private neighbourhoods") or just "countries" and are often seen as a symbol of wealth. However, gated communities enjoy dubious social prestige (many members of the middle and upper middle class regard gated community dwellers as nouveaux riches or snobs). While most gated communities have only houses, some bigger ones, such as Nordelta, have their own hospital, school, shopping mall, and more.

In post-apartheid South Africa, gated communities have mushroomed in response to high levels of violent crime. They are commonly referred to as "complexes" but also broadly classified as "security villages" (large-scale privately developed areas) or "enclosed neighbourhoods". Some of the newest neighbourhoods being developed are almost entirely composed of security villages, some with malls and few other essential services (such as hospitals). In part, property developers have adopted this response to counter squatting, which local residents fear due to associated crime, and which often results in a protracted eviction process.

They are popular in southern China and Hong Kong, where most of the new apartment compounds have 24/7 guards on duty, and for some high-end residences, facial recognition systems to grant residents and domestic workers entry into the compound. The most famous of which is Clifford Estates in Guangzhou.

In Saudi Arabia, gated communities have existed since the discovery of oil, mainly to accommodate families from Europe or North America. After threat levels increased from the late 1990s on against foreigners in general and U.S. citizens in particular, gates became armed, sometimes heavily, and all vehicles are inspected. Marksmen and Saudi Arabian National Guard armored vehicles appeared in certain times, markedly after recent terrorist attacks in areas near-by, targeting people from European or North American countries.

Gated communities are rare in continental Europe and Japan.

Criticism

Proponents of gated communities (and to a lesser degree, of cul-de-sacs) maintain that the reduction or exclusion of people who would be only passing through, or more generally, of all non-local people, makes any "stranger" much more recognisable in the closed local environment, and thus reduces crime danger. However, since only a very small proportion of all non-local people passing through the area are potential criminals, increased traffic should increase rather than decrease safety by having more people around whose presence could deter criminal behaviour or who could provide assistance during an incident.

Another criticism is that gated communities offer a false sense of security. Some studies indicate that safety in gated communities may be more illusion than reality and that gated communities in suburban areas of the United States have no less crime than similar non-gated neighbourhoods.

A commentary in The New York Times specifically blames the gated communities for the shooting death of Trayvon Martin as the columnist states that "gated communities churn a vicious cycle by attracting like-minded residents who seek shelter from outsiders and whose physical seclusion then worsens paranoid groupthink against outsiders."

In an influential paper, Vanessa Watson includes gated communities within a class of "African urban fantasies": attempts to remake African cities in the vein of Dubai or Singapore. In Watson's analysis, this kind of urban planning prizes exclusionary and self-contained spaces that limit opportunities for interaction between different classes, while worsening marginalization of the urban poor.

A study done by Breetzke, Landman & Cohn (2014) had investigated the effect of gated communities on individual's risk of burglary victimization in South Africa. Results shown that not only are gated communities not able to reduce burglary, but even facilitate criminal activities. For both the gated communities and the areas surrounding them, the densities of burglary were found to be four times higher than that of Tshwane. The crime rates did not decrease in areas that were far away from the gated communities. Also, the high risk of burglaries was found consistent in both daytime and night-time. As this research on the effect of gated communities in South Africa reflects a negative correlation between the use of gated communities and crime prevention, the effectiveness of gated communities is in doubt.

Common economic model types
 Life-style — country clubs, retirement developments.
 Prestige — gates for status appeal
 Physical security communities — gates for crime and traffic.
 Purpose-designed communities — catering to foreigners (e.g. worker compounds in Mid-West Asia, built largely for the oil industry)

Comparison to closed cities 

The closed cities of Russia are different from the gated communities.

 The guard duty in closed cities is free to residents (paid by taxes).
 The public transport in closed cities may go with transit checkpoints or checking passes/passports at technical stops and available to others outside the security area. Within a gated community in the best cases, the bus stop is opposite the checkpoint; a few offer free buses. Via gated communities buses go due to easement or good will.
 Fares and communal payment in closed cities are often equal (in all cases not greater) if it would be a common city. In gated communities service companies raise non legally fixed tariffs because it is difficult for those communities either to negotiate lower terms or knock out this service company (in most cases the result is no quorum).

Countries

A limited number of gated communities have long been established for foreigners in various countries of the world:

 The worker compounds in the Middle East, built largely for the oil industry.
 The Arbor Oaks subdivision located in El Monte, California, which appears in the film Back to the Future Part II as "Hilldale", is now gated because of the fans coming to see it in person. Residents are sometimes angry at fans who come by the development.

Argentina 
There are many gated communities in Argentina, especially in Greater Buenos Aires, in the suburb of Pilar, 60 km N of Buenos Aires city, and in other suburban areas, such as Nordelta. Tortugas Country Club was the first gated community developed in Argentina, dating from the 1930s/1940s, but most date from the 1990s, when liberal reforms were consolidated.

Since Buenos Aires has been traditionally regarded as a socially integrated city, gated communities have been the subject of research by sociologists. Gated communities are an important way through middle and upper-class people cope with the high levels of violent criminal activity in Greater Buenos Aires.

Australia 
Although gated communities have been rare in Australia, since the 1980s, a few have been built. The most well-known are those at Hope Island, in particular Sanctuary Cove, on the Gold Coast of Queensland. Other similar projects are being built in the area. In Victoria, the first such development is Sanctuary Lakes, in the local government area of Wyndham, about 16 km south west of Melbourne. In New South Wales, there is Macquarie Links gated community as well as Southgate Estate gated community. Many Australian gated communities are built within private golf courses.

In the ACT, the only example is Uriarra Village, based around community horse paddocks and dwellings jointly managed through strata title.

Brazil 

Brazil also has many gated communities, particularly in the metropolitan regions Rio de Janeiro and São Paulo. For example, one of São Paulo's suburbs, Tamboré, has at least 6 such compounds known as Tamboré 1, 2, 3, and so on. Each consists of generously spaced detached houses with very little to separate front gardens.

One of the first large-scale gated community projects in São Paulo city region was Barueri's Alphaville, planned and constructed during the 1970s military dictatorship when the big cities of Brazil faced steep increases of car ownership by the middle and higher-classes, rural exodus, poverty, crime, urban sprawl, and downtown decay.

Canada 
Neighbourhoods with "physical" or explicit gating with security checkpoints and patrols are extremely rare, being absent in even some of Canada's richest neighbourhoods such as Bridle Path, Toronto. Furthermore, municipal planning laws in many Canadian provinces ban locked gates on public roads as a health issue since they deny emergency vehicles quick access.

A noted exception in Canada is Arbutus Ridge, an age-restricted community constructed between 1988 and 1992 on the southeastern coast of Vancouver Island.

More common in most Canadian neighbourhoods, especially the largest cities, is an implicit or symbolic gating which effectively partitions the private infrastructure and amenities of these communities from their surrounding neighbourhoods. A classic example of this is the affluent Montreal suburb of Mount Royal, which has a long fence running along its side of L'Acadie Boulevard that for all intents and purposes separates the community from the more working-class neighbourhood of Park Extension. Also, many newer suburban subdivisions employ decorative gates to give the impression of exclusivity and seclusion.

China 
In China, some of these compounds, like most other gated communities around the world, target the rich. Also many foreigners live in gated communities in Beijing. Often foreign companies choose the locations where their foreign employees will live, and in most cases, they pay the rent and associated costs (e.g. management fees and garden work).

Similar communities exist in Shanghai, another major Chinese city. Shanghai Links, an exclusive expatriate community enclosing a golf course and the Pudong campus of Shanghai American School, is an example. The Shanghai Links project began in 1994 with the signing by the then Prime Minister of Canada, Honourable Jean Chretien, of a Memorandum of Agreement with the Shanghai Pudong New Area Government controlled company, Huaxia Tourism Development Company. Other notable gated communities in Shanghai include Seasons Villas, a development by Hutchinson Whampoa; Thomson Golf Villas, and Green Villas.

Other gated communities in China such as those in the Daxing District of Beijing enclose the homes of rural migrants. These are intended to reduce crime and increase public order and safety, which the Chinese Communist Party-run People's Daily claims it has, by 73%. The system is controversial as it segregates migrants and the poor, with some claiming its true purpose is to keep track of migrants, but it is scheduled for implementation in Changping District also.

Ecuador 
Guayaquil and Quito, Ecuador have many gated communities. In the coastal city of Guayaquil, they are mostly located in Samborondón and in Quito in the valleys surrounding the city. They are home mostly for the wealthiest people, but there is a trend, especially in Guayaquil, of houses in gated communities with moderate prices as well.

Egypt 
Due to  the population boom and an increasing class segregation, gated communities have been more and more established in Egypt since the 1970s. Greater Cairo, for example, is home to El Rehab and Dreamland, Mountain View Egypt. There is also El Maamoura in Alexandria. They were criticized for being a niche market that fails to address the crippling congestion problem in Cairo.

India 
In India, there are many gated neighbourhoods in big cities where most of the upper middle-class and upper-class people live. New Delhi, Mumbai, Chennai, Bangalore, Noida and the like all have gated communities. Sometimes these communities are separated not just by wealth but also by ethnicity. There are colonies in New Delhi based on profession also like Press Enclave, set up by journalists in the 1970s. Members of a particular ethnicity tend to feel more comfortable living among their own owing to reasons related to common festivals, language, and cuisine. Examples of this are common in New Delhi where there is a strong Punjabi community. Many gated neighbourhoods are predominantly Punjabi and there have been cases of discrimination against members of other ethnic backgrounds living in those villas. As in neighbouring countries, the target for these housing societies seem to be upper-middle or upper class citizens. Caste and religious discrimination is prevalent in the real estate industry. Nonetheless, non-residential Indians (foreigners of Indian origin) are very interested in gated housing.

Indonesia 
In Indonesia, some gated communities are luxurious (with up to 740 square metres (8000 sq ft)), and some are very affordable (with lots ranging from 40 to 120 square metres). From 2000, most of the new residential areas built by private developers are mostly composed of gated communities. Examples include the residential areas of Bumi Serpong Damai in South Tangerang, Tropicana Residence Community in Tangerang City, Telaga Golf Sawangan and Pesona Khayangan in Depok, and Sentul City in Bogor Regency. Gated communities in Indonesia still allow outsiders to use some of the facilities inside the community because there is a regulation that the social facilities in the residential development should be handed to the local government to be used by the public.

Italy 
Two examples of gated community in Italy are Olgiata in Rome and the village of Roccamare, in Castiglione della Pescaia, Tuscany.

Lebanon 
Because of the pollution, the lack of proper infrastructure, electrical power and green spaces in residential areas outside of Beirut, the high class society chooses to reside in gated communities for a better living environment.

Gated communities in Lebanon are mainly in the suburbs of the capital city Beirut.

Malaysia 
In Malaysia, these are known as Gated and Guarded Communities and have been seeing a steady increase in popularity. Currently, according to the Town and Country Planning Department, there are four types of gated communities in Malaysia, namely:
 Elite community: this type of gated community is primarily occupied by the upper-class or high-income group of people. It focuses on exclusion and status in which security is one of the major concerns due to the resident's status within the community.
 Lifestyle community: the lifestyle community generally consists of retirement communities, leisure communities and suburban 'new towns'. Activities inside these communities can include golf courses, horseback riding and residents-oriented leisure activities.
 Security zone community: the security zone community is the most popular type of gated community in which it offers a housing development that is surrounded by fences or gates. This development is normally provided with guard services.
 Security zone community and lifestyle: this type of gated community housing development is usually developed within a city centre. It focuses on both the security aspect and the provision of lifestyle facilities for its residents.

The gated community is a concept that emerged in response to the rise of safety and security issues, and offers more advantages in terms of a calm environment and enhanced safety that is ideal for family development.

Mauritius 
Several gated communities now exist on the island of Mauritius since the government introduced Integrated Resort Schemes (IRS) and Real Estate Schemes (RES) in the mid-1990s. Recently they have been amalgamated into Property Development Schemes (PDS). The government also introduced Smart City permits and in 2016 it secured the assistance of Saudi Arabia to launch the government's version of a gated Smart City known as Heritage City Project which was proposed at Minissy, in the region of Ebène, with the assistance of Saudi Arabia.

Mexico 
Gated communities in Mexico are a result of the huge income gap existing in the country. A 2008 study found that the average income in an urban area of Mexico was $26,654, a rate higher than advanced regions like Spain or Greece while the average income in rural areas (sometimes just a short distance away) was only $8,403. This close a proximity of wealth and poverty has created a large security risk for Mexico's middle class. Gated communities can be found in virtually every medium and large-sized city in Mexico with the largest found in major cities, such as Monterrey, Mexico City or Guadalajara.

Luxury or "status" gated communities are very popular with middle to high income residents in Mexico. Gated luxury communities in Mexico are considerably cheaper than in countries such as the United States while retaining houses of similar size and quality due to the commonness of the communities and the lower cost to build them and are priced lower to attract middle class residents.

Many gated communities in Mexico have fully independent and self-contained infrastructure, such as schools, water and power facilities, security and fire forces, and medical facilities. Some of the larger gated communities even retain their own school districts and police departments. The surrounding areas of Santa Fe, Bosques-Lomas, Interlomas-Bosque Real, are also made up predominantly of gated communities and span over 30% of Greater Mexico City.

Many smaller gated communities in Mexico are not officially classified as separate gated communities as many municipal rules prohibit closed off roads. Most of these small neighbourhoods cater to lower middle income residents and offer a close perimeter and check points similar to an "authentic" gated community. This situation is tolerated and sometimes even promoted by some city governments due to the lack of capacity to provide reliable and trusted security forces.

New Zealand 
In New Zealand, gated communities have been developed in suburban areas of the main cities since the 1980s and 1990s.

Pakistan 

Pakistan has a very large number of gated communities, most of which target middle class Pakistanis. The largest being Bahria Town, which is also the largest in Asia and has communities in major cities. Defence Housing Authority is also a major developer of gated communities.

Others include WAPDA Town, Gulberg, Islamabad and Schon Properties, while Emaar Properties also maintains several gated communities in the country targeting primarily upper class people. Gated communities in Pakistan are mostly immune from problems of law enforcement and lack of energy faced by the majority of the other housing societies. In a short time, the property prices in such communities have greatly increased – in 2007 a 20-square-meter house in Bahria Town, Lahore cost around four million Pakistani rupees ($40,000); a similar property in 2012 costed nine million rupees, while houses are priced around 100-300 million rupees. The Bahria Town of Karachi is currently constructing Rafi Cricket Stadium, when completed will be the largest stadium in the country and Grand Jamia Mosque, when completed will be the largest in South Asia and third-largest in the world.

Peru 
Lima, Peru has several gated communities, especially in the wealthy districts of La Molina and Santiago de Surco. They are home to many prominent Peruvians.

Philippines 

The Philippines has a large number of gated communities which are known in Philippine English as "subdivisions" or "villages". Gated communities represent one of the main residency types for upper and middle class Filipinos up and down the country, along with condominiums. Regardless of their names, such communities may either form part of a larger barangay (village), or constitute a single barangay in and of themselves. Gated communities are often grouped by the phase of build, or by project number, and homes within these communities are designated with a lot and block number on a street as opposed to conventional house numbers or building names. Gated communities are divided between two types:

 Executive subdivisions/villages: Along with condominiums, these are the residential neighbourhoods of the wealthiest in Philippine society. Examples of these include Bel-Air, Greenwoods Executive Villages, Magallanes village, Dasmarinas Village and Ayala Alabang village.
 Subdivisions/villages: Gated communities targeted to the Philippine middle classes. These may begin with a name and end with a number E.g. "Kalayaan Village 3", the 3 designating that it is the third subdivision project for the land development company under the "Kalayaan" homes project. Examples of subdivisions include BF Homes, Camella Homes, among a majority of wealthier suburban areas.

Russia 

Aerobus live complex is the de facto first gated community in Moscow.  Business center is in this complex but outside the residential area.

Potapovo (known as New Moscow, but developed with North Butovo to RAS members) - known as fenced Kommunarka-Butovo road between 1994-2000 and Moscow had to build another road. Service company has bus license and guard wearing uniform is always in a bus (not usual even in strict restricted acsess). Later they opened trade center but neither allowed to cut the corner or use 2 entrances (from northbound). Fence lowers effectiveness of bus routes and direct or loop extension of line 12. This area set to order bus on demand but paxes ordered to walk outside.

Ozero is a cooperative formed around Vladimir Putin's dacha on Lake Komsomolskoe, Priozersky District, Leningrad Oblast.

Saudi Arabia 
In Saudi Arabia, many expatriate workers are required to live in company-provided housing.  After the 2003 attack on Al Hambra, Jadawel, Siyanco and Vinell by militant Saudi dissidents, the government established tight military security for those compounds with large western populations. Many western individuals also reside in the many other gated compounds or non-gated villas and apartments in the cities that they work. Saudi Aramco provides a compound in Dhahran which is one of the largest of its kind within Saudi Arabia. Gated communities are also popular with many Saudis, which accounts for the limited availability of open villas in these communities and the premium rent paid for that housing. These compounds can be found in many of Saudi Arabia's cities, including but not limited to Abha, Dhahran, Riyadh, and Taif.

Singapore 
Sentosa Cove is the only gated residential community in Singapore, containing 350 bungalows on a 99-year leasehold term. It is the only landed housing that can be purchased by non-citizens. Despite this, as of 2021, the properties transact at a lower price to comparable areas on the mainland.

South Africa 
South Africa has an increasing number of gated communities, where the wealthy sometimes live in close proximity to the urban poor (yet with little contact between the two).

Thailand 
Many housing estates in Thailand take the form of gated communities, targeted to the upper and middle classes. They may be managed by the development company or by resident committees.

Gated communities are often referred to as mubans in Thailand.

Turkey 
Turkey has several gated communities, especially in Istanbul and Ankara. Called "site" in Turkish, they are mostly located around the edge of the city.

United Arab Emirates 
In the United Arab Emirates, gated communities have exploded in popularity, particularly in Dubai, where the 2002 decision to allow foreigners to own freehold properties has resulted in the construction of numerous such communities built along various themes.  Examples include The Lakes, Springs, Meadows, and Arabian Ranches.

United Kingdom 

In the United Kingdom, gated communities are relatively rare. In 2004 there were an estimated 1,000 such communities in England (i.e. not including Scotland, Wales and Northern Ireland). As of 2002, the majority of these communities were found to be in the South East and most were small developments; only four local authorities had one or more gated communities with over 300 dwellings. They generally consisted of a gated street of up to 60 or 100 houses, or a single block of flats.

The bulk of gated communities in the United Kingdom have been constructed by private developers, with smaller proportions built by social landlords and through public-private partnerships. Research has found that they typically exist within surrounding areas that are also highly affluent, if not necessarily gated. It has been noted that as far as buyer motivation is concerned, issues of security, exclusivity and prestige were often subsumed by a desire to obtain property that would maintain its value. Although the appeal of these communities is said to be mainly be to "young affluent singles" and older couples, this varies significantly according to location and the availability of accommodation types. Unlike in America, marketing materials rarely refer to any community aspect of living in a gated development.

There is "considerable diversity in terms of the built form" of gated communities. In London, many new-build and converted spaces that have been turned into gated communities consist largely of flats and are therefore unlikely to be suitable for families. The redevelopment of these inner city sites for "secure, upscale, condominium-style housing in central London" was partly fuelled by a cultural shift among young professionals towards "loft-living" in the city centre. Examples from London include the Docklands developments of New Caledonian Wharf, Kings and Queen Wharf and Pan Peninsula, and East London locations like the Bow Quarter in Bow.

Outside London, gated communities tend to be more spacious. The most prestigious gated communities, or "private estates", are generally seen as being those around the fringes of London; these include the large estates at St George's Hill and Wentworth, both of which are in Surrey. In general, there is a heavy concentration around Surrey's Cobham-Esher-Weybridge triangle – examples are Burwood Park and Kingswood Warren, while Blackhills and Clare Hill represent smaller competitors with somewhat lower property values. In suburban Kent, Keston Park and Farnborough Park are most notable.

United States 

The earliest American gated communities date to the 1850s, though it was in the early 1900s when they first began to proliferate. Most communities are today located in the Sun Belt region in the South and West, where there is more land available for development. They are usually developed privately and for this reason it is difficult to determine the total number. Although they are often unincorporated, there are numerous incorporated gated cities in Southern California, namely Bradbury, Canyon Lake, Hidden Hills, Laguna Woods, and Rolling Hills.

In 2002, USA Today reported that approximately 40% of new builds in California were behind walls. By 1997, an estimated 20,000 gated communities had been built across the country.  That year, estimates of the number of people in gated communities ranged from 4 million in 30,000 communities up to around 8 million. This growth continued and by 2009 figures from the American Housing Survey indicated that the number of people living in gated communities had risen to 11 million households. Setha Low, a psychologist who has studied gated communities and their residents, suggested this was likely an underestimate.

The notion that gated communities in the United States are "bastions of affluence" has been challenged by academic research. A 2005 study published in the Journal of Planning Education and Research revealed they often contain both owner-occupied and renter-occupied properties and that socioeconomic status and income levels can vary significantly across communities. Criminologists Nicholas Branic and Charis Kubrin have argued that the "affluent, high socioeconomic status gated communities" of popular imagination in fact represent just one type of gated community.

Ed Blakely distinguishes between "prestige communities" of the rich and socially distinguished and "security zones", in which safety is the main goal. Nevertheless, much of the literature points to gated communities as contributing to greater social seclusion and segregation. Common motivations for moving into them are fear of crime and a desire to escape demographic change — gated communities are generally ethnically homogenous. Alternatively, a 2015 Urban Studies article argued that while gated communities in the southwestern United States entrenched social segregation, no effect was present for racial segregation, as the streets they bordered tended to already be segregated on a racial level.

Uruguay

Gated communities in Uruguay are known locally as 'barrios privados' or private neighbourhoods. There is no official data on how widespread gated communities in Uruguay are, but by 2013 at least 20 were known to exist in the Maldonado Department, seven in the Canelones Department, seven in Rocha, one in Soriano, and two in Rio Negro. Gated communities had experienced "huge growth" by 2020, and were a popular choice for foreigners with families, although rental returns are reportedly low and the properties will not necessarily appreciate in value. While socially exclusive areas exist in the capital Montevideo, such as the Carrasco barrio, the closing of streets is not permitted and attempts to build gated communities within the city limits have been refused.

Contrary to what might be assumed, research has found that gated communities in this country do not increase residential segregation as they select for affluent people who already experience a high degree of segregation. These residents tend to be a very homogenous group in age, family stage, and social class. La Tahona and Carmel are two of the most prominent gated communities located just outside Montevideo in the Canelones Department and nearby to the Zonamerica business park and Carrasco International Airport. La Tahona and Carmel both adjoin Camino de los Horneros, a road immediately north of Ciudad de la Costa that connects to multiple gated communities with 2000 homes in total, though these numbers are expected to eventually treble. Numerous gated communities have also been constructed in Punta Del Este.

Demand for gated communities in Uruguay has increased in recent years due to the growing availability of remote working, and amenities like swimming pools can be found more often than in Montevideo. They have also become more accessible to the professional middle class as pre-designed new builds have become common, as opposed to the older model of requiring individual owners to buy a plot and then hire their own builder. The resulting economies of scale have helped to keep average prices lower than they otherwise would be.

In popular media

In comics
 Early in The Walking Dead comic book series, Rick Grimes attempts to settle in a gated condominium neighbourhood. This move proves disastrous as one of the group members is killed after the survivors realize the neighbourhood is infested with zombies.

In film
 John Duigan's Lawn Dogs (1997), starring Mischa Barton and Sam Rockwell, films a young girl from a gated community who befriends a landscape worker, and examines the societal repercussions of their friendship.
 Mexican film La Zona, directed by Rodrigo Plá, talks about a gated community invaded by a group of very young and poor children.
 In the ABC Family movie Picture This starring Ashley Tisdale, Drew lives in a gated community called Camelot.
 In the Spanish movie Secuestrados, kidnappers take the daughter of a family living in an allegedly secure gated community.
 In the 2007 animated movie Alvin and the Chipmunks, the chipmunks and their guardian Dave Seville live in a gated community.
 In the 2022 film Cheaper by the Dozen, the Baker family relocated from Los Angeles to a gated community in Calabasas, California where they moved into a larger house there to accommodate their large family. By the end of the film, the Baker family move back to Los Angeles.

In games
 Grand Theft Auto IV has a gated community called Beachgate, a fictional rendition of Sea Gate, Brooklyn. It includes the home of early antagonist Mikhail Faustin.

In literature
(Alphabetical by author's last name)
 In Margaret Atwood's novel Oryx and Crake, the characters Snowman and Crake live and work in corporate-owned gated communities known as compounds.
 J.G. Ballard has examined the phenomenon in his novella Running Wild (1988) and in his novel Super-Cannes (2000).
 T.C. Boyle's novel The Tortilla Curtain (1995) is set in and near a gated community in California.
 The novel Parable of the Sower, by Octavia Butler, takes place in a world where much of civilization lives within gated communities.
 In the novel I Will Fear No Evil by Robert A. Heinlein, the wealthiest citizens shelter from urban poverty inside fortress-like guarded gated communities.
 Ira Levin's novel The Stepford Wives (1972) takes place inside an idyllic gated community that secretly enslaves its female members to conform to the standards of the men.
 In the Percy Jackson & the Olympians and The Heroes of Olympus series by Rick Riordan, Elysium is depicted as a gated community from which one could hear laughter and smell barbecue cooking. Besides having the Isle of the Blessed in the center of a large lake there, Elysium has neighbourhoods of beautiful houses from every time period in history such as Roman villas, medieval castles, and Victorian mansions. It also has flowers of silver and gold blooming on the lawns and grass rippling in rainbow colors.
 In Mexico, Fernanda Melchor's third novel Paradais tells the crime committed by two teenagers inside a Mexican gated community of Veracruz, hometown of Melchor. 
 In Argentina, Claudia Piñeiro's Las viudas de los jueves (Thursday Widows) became a local bestseller after winning the 2005 edition of El Clarín newspaper book award. The novel depicts life of dwellers of a gated community, among them, families who enjoyed high incomes now facing economic hardships.
 In Egypt, Ahmed Khaled Towfik's novel Utopia takes readers on a chilling journey beyond the gated communities of the North Coast where the wealthy are insulated from the bleakness of life outside the walls.
 In the novel Snow Crash (1992) by Neal Stephenson, gated communities have evolved into "burbclaves" (suburban enclaves) which are effectively sovereign city-states.

In songs
 In "Versace", Drake says: "This is a gated community please get the fuck off the property"–referring to the gated community of Hidden Hills, California.

In television
 In the Season Six episode of The X-Files entitled "Arcadia", Mulder and Scully investigate disappearances within a gated community that seems to be harboring a terrible secret involving a Tulpa.
 In the cartoon As Told By Ginger, the Griplings reside in Protective Pines.
 In the SpongeBob SquarePants episode "Squidville", Squidward Tentacles temporarily moves to a gated community of squids to get away from SpongeBob SquarePants and Patrick Star.
 The Bravo network reality television series The Real Housewives of Orange County was initially set primarily in the gated community of Coto de Caza, California ("Coto") and followed the lavish livestyles of "housewives" and their families who resided within Coto.  One housewife, Lauri Waring, who lived in a Ladera Ranch townhouse, was the exception-to-the-rule that was used as a foil to the extravagant lifestyle of the other four housewives, who lived "behind the Coto gates".
 Most of The Starter Wife miniseries is set within the gated community where the main character's friend lives. She even becomes friends with the security guard at the front gate.
 The pilot episode of the 2002 revival of The Twilight Zone titled "Evergreen" deals with a gated community called Evergreen Estates which has a sinister way of dealing with nonconformity that involves rebellious children committing those acts being taken to "Arcadia Fertilizer Company" where they are executed and made into red fertilizer for the small trees in front of the houses there.
 In one episode of VeggieTales (Sherlock Holmes and the Golden Ruler), Larry sings a song about gated communities in Silly Songs with Larry.
 In seasons 1-3 of Weeds, Nancy Botwin and her family inhabit the gated community of Agrestic.
 In The Neighbors, a 2012 TV series in the United States, a family has relocated to a gated townhouse community called "Hidden Hills" in New Jersey only they discover that the entire community is populated by residents from another planet who identify themselves by the names of sport celebrities, patrol the community in golf carts, receive nourishment through their eyes and mind by reading books rather than eating, and cry green goo from their ears.
 In Safe, a Netflix original series, it tells the mystery in and around a gated community.
 In the short-lived TV series The Gates, Nick Monohan and his family move from Chicago to a quiet, upscale planned community called The Gates where he will be its chief of police. They soon realize that their neighbors are not who they seem to be. The Gates is filled with such beings as vampires, witches, werewolves, and a succubus.

See also
 Age-restricted community
 Barracks
 Castle
 Closed city
 Closed community
 Condominium
 Defensive wall
 Fort
 Homeowners association
 Peace lines
 Planned unit development
 Private community

References

Further reading
 Arizaga, Maria Cecilia: El Mito de comunidad en la Ciudad Mundializada. 
 [Arizaga, Maria Cecilia: Murallas y barrios cerrados, La morfología espacial del ajuste en Buenos Aires. Nueva Sociedad, 166, 2000  ]
 Blakely, Edward J. and Mary Gail Snyder; Fortress America: Gated Communities in the United States; Brookings Institution Press, New Ed edition (15 June 1999); 
 Gasior-Niemiec, Anna; Glasze, Georg and Pütz, Robert (2009): A Glimpse over the Rising Walls: The Reflection of Post-Communist Transformation in the Polish Discourse of Gated Communities. In: East European Politics & Societies 23 (2009) 2: 244–265.  
 Glasze, Georg, Chris Webster and Klaus Frantz (2006): "Introduction: global and local perspectives on the rise of private neighbourhoods". In: Georg Glasze, Chris Webster and Klaus Frantz (Eds.): Private Cities: Global and Local Perspectives. Routledge. London und New York: 1–8.  
 Glasze, Georg (2003): Private Neighbourhoods as Club Economies and Shareholder Democracies. – In: BelGeo 1/2003 Theme Issue "Privatization of Urban Spaces in Contemporary European Cities": 87-98  
Libertun de Duren, Nora. "Planning à la Carte: The location patterns of gated communities around Buenos Aires in a decentralized planning context". International Journal of Urban and Regional Research 30.2 (2006): 308–327.
 Low, Setha M: Behind the Gates: Life, Security and the Pursuit of Happiness in Fortress America. Routledge: New York and London: 2003.
 Webster, Chris, Georg Glasze und Klaus Frantz (2002): "The global spread of gated communities". In: Environment and Planning B 29 (2002) 3: 315-320

External links
 Built Metaphors: Gated Communities and Fiction, by Stéphane Degoutin and Gwenola Wagon
 Gated communities as an urban pathology?, by Renaud Le Goix
 The Privatization of Urban Space: Gated Communities - A New Trend in Global Urban Development?
 Land Use and Design Innovations in Private Communities
 China's Transition at a Turning Point
 Forbes: Most Expensive Gated Communities In America 2004
 Fortress Bulgaria: gated communities
 Max Zirzow, Fran Espinoza and Jonas Janssen. 2012. "Gated Communities". InterAmerican Wiki: Terms - Concepts - Critical Perspectives.

Access control
Types of communities
 
Security engineering
Human habitats